The Shergotty meteorite (Named after Sherghati) is the first example of the shergottite Martian meteorite family. It was a  meteorite which fell to Earth at Sherghati, in the Gaya district, Bihar, India on 25 August 1865, and was retrieved by witnesses almost immediately. Radiometric dating indicates that it solidified from a volcanic magma about 4.1 billion years ago. It is composed mostly of pyroxene and is thought to have undergone preterrestrial aqueous alteration for several centuries. Certain features within its interior are suggestive of being remnants of biofilm and their associated microbial communities.

See also
 ALH84001  meteorite
 Glossary of meteoritics
 Life on Mars
 List of meteorites on Mars
 Nakhla meteorite 
 NWA 7034 meteorite
 Yamato 000593 meteorite

References

Meteorites found in India
Martian meteorites
Environment of Bihar
1865 in India
1865 in the environment
1860s in science
History of Bihar
Astrobiology
Extraterrestrial life